Allan Michael Rock  (born August 30, 1947) is a Canadian lawyer, former politician, diplomat and university administrator. He was Canada's ambassador to the United Nations (2004–2006) and had previously served in the Cabinet of Jean Chrétien, most notably as Justice Minister (1993–1997) and Health Minister (1997–2002).

Rock was appointed as president and vice-chancellor of the University of Ottawa by its board of governors on June 3, 2008. His term began on July 15, 2008, and it ended on July 1, 2016. Rock was subsequently designated president emeritus.

Rock joined the University of Ottawa Faculty of Law in 2018, where he is currently a full professor specializing in subjects related to international law (notably international humanitarian law).

Early life
Allan Rock was born to James Thomas Rock and Anne (née Torley) Rock in Ottawa, where he was raised and educated through secondary school. He received a B.A. in 1968 and an LL.B. in 1971 at the University of Ottawa, and he began a 20-year career as a trial lawyer where he specialized in civil, commercial, and administrative litigation.

Rock served as president of the Student Federation of the University of Ottawa (SFUO) for the 1969-70 year. He had previously served on the executive of the Arts students association and briefly as SFUO External Commissioner.

In June 1969, Rock met John Lennon during the latter’s famous "bed-in" in Montreal, and invited him to Ottawa to attend a "peace conference”, which he accepted. Following a press conference in Ottawa, Rock drove Lennon and wife Yoko Ono around the city in Rock’s modest Volkswagen. At Lennon’s request, they went to Prime Minister Pierre Trudeau’s official residence at 24 Sussex Drive; however, Trudeau was not home, so the legendary Beatle wrote a note on the spot and left it at the door. Six months later, Lennon returned to Ottawa and finally met Trudeau.

On graduation from law school, Rock joined Fasken & Calvin, a noted Bay Street law firm in Toronto, where he worked in the litigation department with Walter Williston, Ron Rolls, and Bill Graham. He rose to become partner. Rock and Rolls co-taught the civil procedure section of the Bar Admission course (bringing a frown to many young lawyer's face).

Rock became the 52nd Treasurer of the Law Society of Upper Canada, serving from 1992 until 1993.

Ministerial career
In 1993, he was elected as the Member of Parliament for Etobicoke Centre and named Minister of Justice and Attorney General of Canada. In that capacity, he introduced significant changes to the Criminal Code, the Canadian Human Rights Act, and other federal legislation. He became Minister of Health in 1997, where he facilitated the creation of the Canadian Institutes of Health Research (CIHR) and more than doubled annual health research funding on a national scale.

Subsequently, as Minister of Industry and the Minister responsible for Infrastructure Canada, he introduced Canada's innovation strategy, was responsible for Canada's three granting councils (the CIHR, Natural Sciences and Engineering Research Council (NSERC), and the Social Sciences and Humanities Research Council (SSHRC)), and introduced legislation to create the Pierre Elliott Trudeau Foundation to promote applied research in the social sciences and the humanities.

Rock initially declared he would run in the Liberal Party of Canada leadership race to replace the retiring Jean Chrétien. However, he was unable to affect Paul Martin's commanding lead. In 2003, Rock quickly dropped out of the leadership race and announced his tepid support for Martin. When Prime Minister Paul Martin was departing as leader of the Liberal Party of Canada, Rock was mentioned as a potential candidate to replace him, but on February 3, 2006, Rock announced that he would not run for leadership of the Liberal Party.  He later endorsed Stéphane Dion's successful bid to lead the party.

Ambassador to United Nations
On December 12, 2003, Queen Elizabeth II, on the advice of Paul Martin, appointed Rock as Canada's ambassador to the United Nations. Rock resigned his seat in the House of Commons and took office in early 2004. As Canada's ambassador to the UN, Rock spoke to the UN General Assembly on April 13, 2004, encouraging participation of the member nations of the United Nations on the matter of the Kimberley Process Certification Scheme.

As the voice of Canadians at the United Nations, Rock was an outspoken advocate of human rights, human security, and reforming the UN. At the 2005 World Summit at the UN, Rock led the successful Canadian effort to secure the adoption by world leaders of the doctrine "Responsibility to Protect" that maintains that the United Nations is mandated to protect populations from genocide, ethnic cleansing, war crimes, and crimes against humanity when national governments fail to extend such protection or are themselves engaged in such crimes against their own people. Other roles at the UN included chairing a working group on obstacles to long-term development in Haiti, efforts to end the conflict in Northern Uganda and peace negotiations in Abuja, Nigeria involving the Government of Sudan and representatives of the three main rebel groups seeking greater autonomy for Darfur.

Rock tendered his resignation in February 2006, and on February 16, the newly elected Conservative Prime Minister Stephen Harper announced the appointment of Rock's replacement, John McNee. Rock remained in office until June 30, 2006 at Harper's request. Upon his departure, he called for an overhaul of the UN.
Rock submitted a report about child soldiers in Sri Lanka on January 15, 2007 to the UN.

After public life
Rock announced earlier in June 2006 that he would be moving to Windsor, Ontario, to resume his legal career with Harvey Thomas Strosberg at Sutts, Strosberg LLP.  Rock continued to publish op-eds around international issues, including the conduct of UN peacekeepers, the Syrian refugee crisis, and the G20.

University of Ottawa President
It was announced in May 2008 that Rock would be appointed as the next president of the University of Ottawa. Rock was an alumnus of the university and had graduated in 1970 with a law degree.

In 1969, during his time as a student at the University of Ottawa, Rock was President of the SFUO (the Student Federation of the University of Ottawa), then the undergraduate student union for the University of Ottawa Following the announcement of Rock's appointment as President of the University of Ottawa, The Ottawa Citizen wrote:
At a time when the university, like other Canadian campuses, is experiencing a resurgence in student activism, Mr. Rock would bring a sensitivity to student issues, said Mr. Mitchell. "This is something that Allan Rock is particularly qualified for, being a former student leader himself."

On December 1, 2009, Rock made a guest appearance in the University of Ottawa Theatre Department's production of the play Les amis. Funds raised by this event went to the United Way Campaign and the Bon Appétit! Student Food Bank.

In two separate incidents during Rock's tenure, members of the University of Ottawa hockey team were accused of sexual misconduct. Rock called the scandals "repugnant", suspended the entire team, and set up a Task Force on Respect and Equality.  Ten months later, the task force released a report making 11 recommendations, which Rock promised to implement, saying "that his school will become a 'beacon' dedicated to eradicating issues of sexual violence."

His term ended on July 1, 2016, and Rock was succeeded by Jacques Frémont.

Controversies

Censorship
On February 26, 2009, the Canadian Civil Liberties Association wrote to Rock to express its concern over his administration's banning of a student poster and to ask that he redress the situation with a public declaration.

Ann Coulter
Amid much media attention, right-wing commentator and author Ann Coulter was scheduled to give a talk at the University of Ottawa on March 23, 2010. The talk was cancelled following student protests at the talk venue. The organizers of the event blamed the university and the protesters. Rock in turn responded in a university press release suggesting that the organizers may have needlessly cancelled the talk.  At the centre of the controversy was a letter sent to Coulter before her scheduled talk in Ottawa, signed by the Vice President (Academic), which warned that Coulter could be arrested for hate speech. The letter was condemned as a violation of academic freedom by the Canadian Association of University Teachers and was widely criticized in the media. Three weeks after the cancelled event, Rock publicly stated having pre-approved the letter as the institution's official response.

Honours 
In 2017, Rock was made a member of Order of Ontario.

Electoral record

References

External links

1947 births
Living people
Lawyers in Ontario
Members of the 26th Canadian Ministry
Members of the House of Commons of Canada from Ontario
Liberal Party of Canada MPs
Members of the King's Privy Council for Canada
Members of the Order of Ontario
People from Etobicoke
Politicians from Ottawa
Permanent Representatives of Canada to the United Nations
University of Ottawa alumni
Treasurers of the Law Society of Upper Canada
Canadian Ministers of Health
Canadian university and college chief executives
University of Ottawa Faculty of Law alumni
Canadian King's Counsel
Members of the Order of Canada